Suresh Chandra Das is a Nepalese politician, belonging to the Nepal Communist Party currently serving as the member of the 1st Federal Parliament of Nepal. In the 2017 Nepalese general election he was elected from the Siraha 2 constituency, securing 20148 (35.49%)  votes.

References

Nepal MPs 2017–2022
Living people
Nepal MPs 1991–1994
Nepal MPs 1994–1999
Communist Party of Nepal (Maoist Centre) politicians
Nepali Congress politicians from Madhesh Province
1956 births